The United States Disc Golf Championship is a disc golf tournament held at the Winthrop Gold Course, on the campus of Winthrop University in Rock Hill, South Carolina. The professional event has been held annually as a PDGA sanctioned Major since 1999. Along with the PDGA World Championships, it is one of the most prestigious major tournaments in disc golf. The primary sponsor for the event since its beginnings in 1999 has been Innova Champion Discs, a prominent disc manufacturer. Ken Climo currently holds a record five US Disc Golf Championships. The 2016 USDGC champion, Jeremy "Big Jerm" Koling, was leading the tournament after the third round. He was declared the winner when the fourth round was canceled due to inclement weather produced by Hurricane Matthew.

The 2011 USDGC was played in a different format to the previous twelve events. Each player was assigned a projected score on each hole based on their PDGA Player Rating. The Player's official score was how they played in comparison to their projected score. For Example, if a player had a projected score of 90 and they finished their round at 81, their official tournament score was a -9. The player with the best official tournament score across all four rounds was John Key   who scored -16. Because of the change to the format, Key is often omitted from the list of USDGC Champions.

USDGC Champions

References

External links
 USDGC / United States Disc Golf Championship

Disc golf in the United States
Rock Hill, South Carolina
Sports in South Carolina
Disc golf tournaments